Lyons Township is the name several townships in the United States:

Illinois 
Lyons Township, Cook County, Illinois

Iowa 
Lyons Township, Mills County, Iowa

Michigan 
Lyons Township, Michigan

Minnesota 
Lyons Township, Lyon County, Minnesota
Lyons Township, Wadena County, Minnesota

South Dakota 
Lyons Township, Minnehaha County, South Dakota

See also 
 Lyon Township (disambiguation)

Township name disambiguation pages